St. Mary's School is a co-educational English medium school established in 1976. It is located at Jajpur Road, Odisha, India. The school is dedicated to the divine patronage of Mary. It is an institution managed by the Cuttack Roman Catholic Diocesan Corporation, and administered by the Nuns of Franciscan Handmaids of Mary. The school is affiliated to the Council for the Indian School Certificate Examinations.

The school organizes the annual Tarun Memorial Cricket Tournament, named after a student of the school, late Tarun Samal.

See also 
 List of Christian schools in India
 List of schools in India

References

Franciscan education
Catholic schools in India
Christian schools in Odisha
Private schools in Odisha
Educational institutions established in 1976
1976 establishments in Orissa